Polwarth and South Grenville was an electoral district of the Legislative Assembly in the Australian state of Victoria from 1859 to 1889. It was based in western Victoria.

Polwarth and South Grenville was created after the Electoral district of Polwarth, Ripon, Hampden and South Grenville was divided in 1859.

Members for Polwarth and South Grenville

After the abolition of Polwarth and South Grenville in 1889, a new Electoral district of Polwarth was created, Charles Forrest went on to represent Polwarth from April 1889 to September 1894.

References

Former electoral districts of Victoria (Australia)
1859 establishments in Australia
1889 disestablishments in Australia